John Holliday was an early American pioneer who was the first white settler to build a cabin along a cove on Harmon Creek in what was once Brooke County, West Virginia (formerly western Virginia) but today is Hancock County, West Virginia.  The town of Hollidays Cove was named after John Holliday and was officially founded in 1793.

See also
Hollidays Cove
Hancock County, West Virginia
Weirton, West Virginia

External links
Hancock County Facts
Hancock County History
History of Weirton
History of Weirton Steel
Weirton Cyclopedia
West Virginia County Histories

Year of birth missing
Year of death missing
People from Hancock County, West Virginia